Southcoast247, a subsidiary of the SouthCoast Media Group, is an arts & entertainment magazine and online web site based in New Bedford, Massachusetts.

Online
Southcoast247.com launched on October 4, 2004 to "fill in the gap for a comprehensive Arts & Entertainment site to serve the 18- to 34-year-old demographic of the SouthCoast region of Massachusetts." Southcoast247.com covers a wide spectrum of entertainment, both locally and nationally, including music, movies, technology, arts, sports, and fashion. In July 2009, its staff was liquidated. Today, the South Coast Media Group largely uses the brand to recycle mainstream media content.

Online Awards
 2005: Best Web Site Idea, Circulation 20,001 - 60,000, New England Newspaper Advertising Executives Association, Advertising Awards.
 2008: Finalist for Best Local Guide or Entertainment Site, Circulation Less Than 75,000 — The Newspaper Association of America.
 2008: CoolHomePages Design Award in Entertainment, Color Schemes, Ezine, Usability, and Very Clean categories.

Print
The first issue of Southcoast247 PRINT was released in September 2007. The magazine was a free monthly publication available in 12 Southeastern Massachusetts towns and cities.

In January 2009, Southcoast247 PRINT was cancelled due to budget cuts. Southcoast247 is now a web portal used to recycle South Coast Today content.

References

External links
 Southcoast247 Official Website
 Southcoast247 on MySpace

Entertainment magazines published in the United States
Monthly magazines published in the United States
Online magazines published in the United States
Defunct magazines published in the United States
Free magazines
Magazines established in 2007
Magazines disestablished in 2009
Magazines published in Massachusetts
Online magazines with defunct print editions